The 2016 NCAA Division I men's ice hockey tournament was the national championship tournament for men's college ice hockey in the United States in 2016. The tournament involved 16 teams in single-elimination play to determine the national champion at the Division I level of the NCAA, the highest level of competition in college hockey. The tournament's Frozen Four – the semifinals and finals – were hosted by the University of Wisconsin and the Tampa Bay Sports Commission at Amalie Arena in Tampa, Florida.

North Dakota defeated Quinnipiac 5–1 to win the program's 8th NCAA title.

This is the first time in NCAA college hockey history that a first year coach, Brad Berry, won the NCAA title.

Tournament procedure

The tournament consisted of four groups of four teams in regional brackets.  The four regionals are officially named after their geographic areas.  The following were the sites for the 2016 regionals:
March 25–26
Midwest Regional, US Bank Arena – Cincinnati (Host: Miami University)
Northeast Regional, DCU Center – Worcester, Massachusetts (Host: Holy Cross)
March 26–27
East Regional, Times Union Center – Albany, New York (Host: ECAC Hockey)
West Regional, Xcel Energy Center – St. Paul, Minnesota (Host: University of Minnesota)

The winner of each regional advanced to the Frozen Four:
April 7–9
Amalie Arena – Tampa, Florida (Host: University of Wisconsin)

Qualifying teams
The at-large bids and seeding for each team in the tournament were announced on March 20. Hockey East had six teams receive a berth in the tournament, NCHC had four teams receive a berth, ECAC Hockey had three teams receive a berth, and one team from the Big Ten Conference, Atlantic Hockey, and the Western Collegiate Hockey Association (WCHA) received a berth.

Number in parentheses denotes overall seed in the tournament.

Tournament bracket

Note: * denotes overtime period(s)

Results

East Region – Albany, New York

Regional semifinal

Regional Final

West Region – Saint Paul, Minnesota

Regional semifinal

Regional Final

Midwest Region – Cincinnati

Regional semifinal

Regional Final

Northeast Region – Worcester, Massachusetts

Regional semifinal

Regional Final

Frozen Four – Tampa, Florida

Semifinal

National Championship – Tampa, Florida

Record by conference

Media

Television
ESPN has US television rights to all games during the tournament for the twelfth consecutive year. ESPN will air every game, beginning with the regionals, on ESPN, ESPN2, ESPNews, ESPNU, or ESPN3 and will stream them online via WatchESPN.

In Canada, the tournament is broadcast by TSN and streamed on TSN Go.

Broadcast Assignments
Regionals
Midwest Regional: Allen Bestwick & Colby Cohen – Cincinnati, Ohio
Northeast Regional: John Buccigross, Barry Melrose & Quint Kessenich – Worcester, Massachusetts
East Regional: Kevin Brown & Billy Jaffe – Albany, New York
West Regional: Clay Matvick & Sean Ritchlin – St. Paul, Minnesota

Frozen Four & Championship
John Buccigross, Barry Melrose, & Quint Kessenich – Tampa, Florida

Radio
Westwood One has exclusive radio rights to the Frozen Four and will air both the semifinals and the championship.
Sean Grande, Cap Raeder, & Shireen Saski

All-Tournament team

Frozen Four
G: Cam Johnson (North Dakota)
D: Troy Stecher (North Dakota)
D: Connor Clifton (Quinnipiac)
F: Drake Caggiula* (North Dakota)
F: Brock Boeser (North Dakota)
F: Travis St. Denis (Quinnipiac)
* Most Outstanding Player(s)

References

Tournament
NCAA Division I men's ice hockey tournament
NCAA Division I men's ice hockey tournament
NCAA Division I men's ice hockey tournament
NCAA Division I men's ice hockey tournament
NCAA Division I men's ice hockey tournament
NCAA Division I men's ice hockey tournament
NCAA Division I men's ice hockey tournament
NCAA Division I men's ice hockey tournament
2010s in Cincinnati
21st century in Saint Paul, Minnesota
21st century in Tampa, Florida
Ice hockey competitions in Ohio
Ice hockey competitions in Cincinnati
Ice hockey competitions in Worcester, Massachusetts
Ice hockey competitions in Saint Paul, Minnesota
Ice hockey competitions in Tampa, Florida
Ice hockey competitions in Albany, New York